A ministry of transport or transportation is a ministry responsible for transportation within a country. It usually is administered by the minister for transport. The term is also sometimes applied to the departments or other government agencies administering transport in nations who do not employ ministers.

Specific responsibilities may include overseeing road safety, civil aviation, maritime transport, rail transport, developing government transportation policy, organizing public transport, and the maintenance and construction of infrastructural projects. Some ministries have additional responsibilities in related policy areas such as infrastructure, public works, waterworks, construction, communication, housing and economic activities, such as industry and trade.

In many jurisdictions, transportation policy is often assumed by an infrastructure ministry.

Country-related articles and lists

See also
 Department of Transportation

References 

 
Transport